Harry Otto Schwalbe (February 8, 1874 - 21 May 1935, Atlantic City General Hospital, Atlantic City) was Secretary and Treasurer of First National Pictures, Inc., until he tendered his resignation at the end of the fiscal year in April 1925. According to a New York Clipper article dated July 21, 1920, Schwalbe and his partner E.S. O'Keefe purchased the City Theatre in Atlantic City for a reported sum of $200,000. On April 14, 1921, Schwalbe completed the purchase of the Keystone hotel property in Conshohocken, Pennsylvania, with the intention of razing the buildings on that property to develop a modern motion picture theatre that would seat 1,200.

References

1874 births
1935 deaths
American corporate directors
American film industry accountants
American people of German descent
Place of birth missing
Place of death missing